Taylors UniLink is a private university located in the city of Melbourne, Australia, offering accredited higher education diplomas.

Taylors UniLink is a part of Study Group and partners with over 200 university across the United States, Canada, the United Kingdom and Europe, China, Australia and New Zealand.

Partner Universities 

Taylors UniLink has partnerships  with fourteen universities across Australia.Its partner universities include:

Bond University (CRICOS 00017B)
Charles Sturt University  (CRICOS 00005F NSW, 01947G VIC and 02960B ACT)
Deakin University (CRICOS 00113B)
Edith Cowan University  (CRICOS 00279B)
Flinders University (CRICOS 00114A)
Griffith University  (CRICOS 00233E)
La Trobe University  (CRICOS 00115M)
Murdoch University (CRICOS 00125J)
Queensland University of Technology (CRICOS 00213J)
RMIT University (CRICOS 00122A)
Swinburne University of Technology  (CRICOS 00111D)
University of Technology Sydney (CRICOS 00099F)
The University of Newcastle  (CRICOS 00109J)
University of Wollongong (CRICOS 00102E)

Campus Facilities 

Taylors UniLink campus is located in Melbourne city, housed in a building and near the city center.

References

Categories

Private universities and colleges
Tertiary education
Schools of English as a second or foreign language

vi:Taylors College